Giacomino Granchi was an Italian politician.

Granchi was a member of the Italian Socialist Party and was elected Mayor of Pisa on 15 July 1986, after the resignation of mayor Oriano Ripoli. He served as assessor for urbanistics policies and Deputy President of Tuscany from 1990 to 1992.

See also
1985 Italian local elections
List of mayors of Pisa

References

External links
 
 

1946 births
Mayors of Pisa
Italian Socialist Party politicians
2011 deaths
20th-century Italian politicians